Sulubağ is a neighbourhood in the Silvan District of Diyarbakır Province in Turkey.

References

Villages in Silvan District